Meeker Historic District is a historic district in Meeker, Colorado which was listed on the National Register of Historic Places in 2019.  It includes parts of Main, 4th, 5th, 6th, 7th and 8th Streets.

References

Historic districts in Colorado
National Register of Historic Places in Colorado
Rio Blanco County, Colorado